Melcher Media is a book packager and publisher in New York City, New York, founded in 1994 by Charles Melcher. The company’s focuses include theater-, movie-, and TV-related books; environmental titles; pop-up books; and DuraBooks. 

The company has produced more than 175 titles, including 30 New York Times best sellers, such as An Inconvenient Truth by Al Gore (Rodale), The Wisdom of Sundays by Oprah Winfrey (Flatiron), The Mamba Mentality by Kobe Bryant (MCD/FSG), and Martha Stewart's Organizing (Houghton Mifflin),  as well as the official companions to Hamilton (Grand Central), Stranger Things (Del Rey), and Wicked (Hachette). 

Melcher Media is known for highly visual, innovative, and physically distinctive books, such as a pink faux-alligator binding of Sex and the City: Kiss and Tell, a gold-embossed double-gatefold cover for Tutankhamun: Treasures of the Golden Pharaoh, and J.J. Abrams's S., which contained more than 22 inserted artifacts.

Future of StoryTelling

Melcher Media founded and produced The Future of StoryTelling (FoST) summit, an exclusive gathering of highly influential people that are shaping the way that technology is revolutionizing human communications. Organized around a series of intimate, high-level discussions with inspiring speakers, as well as immersive experiences, this participatory summit will expose top-tier individuals and corporations to the new ideas and technologies that are driving the storytelling renaissance in the digital age.

DuraBooks

In 2004, Melcher Media received  for a waterproof book-binding technology, known as DuraBooks. Using synthetic paper, DuraBooks are durable yet also recyclable. The most prominent DuraBook titles include Michael Braungart and William McDonough’s Cradle to Cradle (North Point) and Aqua Erotica: 18 Stories for a Steamy Bath (Three Rivers). Cradle to Cradle Design uses DuraBook technology as an example of an "upcyclable" product.

Awards

2008: New York Book Show, First Place, Cookbook, Deceptively Delicious
 2008: New York Book Show, Second Place, Photography, Illumination
 2008: New York Book Show, Second Place, General Books, The Sopranos
 2008: New York Book Show, Third Place, Gift Book, Shakespeare’s Genealogies
 2006: AIGA Fifty Books/Fifty Covers, Avenue Q
 2005: AIGA Fifty Books/Fifty Covers, Wicked
 2005: American Photo, 10 Best Photography Books of the Year, Individuals

External links
 Melcher Media website

Notes

Book publishing companies based in New York City
Publishing companies established in 1994
Book packagers
1994 establishments in New York City